Lone Gram is Danish microbiologist known for her work in bacterial physiology, microbial communication, and biochemicals that originate from bacterial cultures. She is an elected member of the Royal Danish Academy of Sciences and Letters and has received the Order of the Dannebrog.

Education and career 
Gram's first microbiology course led her away from her initial career interests in medicine, and into marine bacteria. Gram has both an M.Sc. (1985) and a Ph.D. (1989) from the Royal Veterinary and Agricultural University in Denmark. Following her Ph.D., Gram joined the Technological Laboratory of the Danish Ministry of Fishes. In 2010 she was promoted to professor at the Technical University of Denmark. Gram has also spent time working at Harvard Medical School and at the University of New South Wales.

Research 
Gram's research centers on the physiology of bacteria in the environment and using bacteria for biotechnology. Her early research examined variability in the bacteria found in spoiled fish, removing bacterial biofilms, and preventing biofilms using compounds from the red algae Delisea pulchra. She has examined the interactions across different species of bacteria, and the production of compounds that send messages among bacteria. Her research includes investigations bacterial attachment to surfaces, and quantification of hydrogen sulfide production by bacteria associated with fish. From 2006 until 2007, Gram participated in the Galathea 3 expeditions, and she is using the bacterial cultures initiated during the project to mine bacteria for chemical compounds that may be useful to people. Gram's research extends to investigations of the global distribution of bacterial species, and an examination of how the presence of varying nutrients alters the chemical compounds produced by bacteria.

Selected publications

Awards and honors 
In 2008, Gram received Tagea Brandt Rejselegat, an award given to Danish women to recognize significant contributions in science, literature, or art. In 2016, Gram received the Villum Kann Rasmussen Annual Award in Science and Technology, which is given in recognition of "a particularly valuable contribution to the technical and natural sciences". In 2018, she received the Order of the Dannebrog. In 2020, Gram was elected a member of the Royal Danish Academy of Sciences and Letters.

Personal life 
Gram's great-grandfather was Hans Christian Gram who developed the Gram stain, a commonly used technique in microbial ecology. Gram is also distantly related to the Danish historian Hans Gram.

References

External links 

 

Living people
Danish scientists
Women microbiologists
Order of the Dannebrog
21st-century women
1960 births